Paseki is a helmet from Indonesia. It is used by the ethnic groups of eastern Indonesia, such as the Toraja and Minahasa of Sulawesi.

Description 
The paseki is usually made of brass. It is made on the model of the Spanish Morion helmets. The first versions of these helmets were imported to Indonesia by the VOC (Dutch East India Company) around 1602 to 1795. The helmets are richly decorated with metal pads and a helmet bush (decoration). The helmet bush is made according to the own wishes of the Indonesian warriors.

Gallery

See also 

 Katapu
 Takula tofao

References 

Indonesian inventions
Medieval helmets
Combat helmets